Hominy Creek is a stream in the U.S. state of West Virginia.

Hominy is a name derived from the Algonquian language meaning a type of meal prepared from corn.

See also
List of rivers of West Virginia

References

Rivers of Greenbrier County, West Virginia
Rivers of Nicholas County, West Virginia
Rivers of West Virginia